Air Vice Marshal John Henry Staples Hamilton,  is a former senior commander in the Royal New Zealand Air Force, who served as Chief of Air Force from 2002 until his retirement from the Air Force in 2006.

In June 2006 it was announced that Hamilton would become the Director of New Zealand's Ministry of Civil Defence and Emergency Management. Following the February 2011 Christchurch earthquake, Hamilton became National Controller of the Civil Defence Emergency Response, with Civil Defence as lead agency, supported by New Zealand Police, Fire Service, Defence Force and many other agencies and organisations. He stepped down from Civil Defence in 2014. In 2019 he took up the position of operations manager for Air Napier.

References

External links
 John Henry Staples Hamilton family tree record

Living people
New Zealand Members of the Royal Victorian Order
Officers of the New Zealand Order of Merit
Royal New Zealand Air Force air marshals
People associated with the 2011 Christchurch earthquake
Year of birth missing (living people)